Horokiwi is an outer northern suburb of Wellington. The area is semi-rural and there are no schools; most children attend schools in nearby Lower Hutt, and Primary School zoning is for Korokoro. The only feature other than houses and farms is Horokiwi Quarry.

Access and roads
The only access to Horokiwi is via Horokiwi Road, a road that climbs up a hill and branches off the Petone-Wellington motorway. There are only five streets/roads; Horokiwi Road, Hillcroft Road, Lincolnshire Road, Woollaston Way and Van Der Velden Way. The former runs for approximately 6.5 km, and the final kilometer eventually reaches Belmont Regional Park and becomes much more narrow. It also provides scenic views of Lower Hutt, Wellington Harbour, and other northern suburbs of Wellington such as Tawa and Grenada North.

Since 2010 the only access to Horokiwi is from the northbound lane of the State Highway (SH2), causing around 8 km detours for residents traveling from North.

The Caribbean Avenue Reserve can be accessed from Horokiwi Road.

Earliest history of Horokiwi
The Horokiwi/Korokoro area has historically been used for travel between the Hutt Valley and Porirua. European settlers in the district in the early part of the 19th century travelled for the most part on well-used old Maori tracks.
In the 1880s, prominent Wellington settler James Coutts Crawford wrote about his journey from the Kapiti Coast to Port Nicholson following his arrival in New Zealand in late 1839:

"Passing Titahi Bay, and the pretty shores of Porirua, we entered the main bush, and travelled up the stream, in a line with whose course the present road stretches. We crossed and recrossed the stream about seventy times, until at length the path ascended and led us over the summit of the range overlooking Korokoro. The whole distance traversed, with the exception of some few patches of cultivation at Porirua, was through dense and uncleared forest.
The Hutt Valley presented a dense forest of gigantic trees, and a large pa was visible at Pitone. As we descended the hill, our advance was hindered by a mass of newly-felled forest, which was cleared and ready for burning off. Our escort now commenced firing guns to attract the attention of the fishermen; and as we descended the hill the canoes approached the shore, so that when we reached it, they were there to meet us"
(Coutts 1880: pp 27–28).

After the Petone settlement was removed and relocated to its current site of Wellington City, the track from Kaiwharawhara across Paerau hill was used more. This track joined with the Korokoro track at Takapu and then carried on to Porirua.

Demographics

Horokiwi, comprising the statistical areas of 7021094 and 7021151, covers  an area of  It had a population of 183 at the 2018 New Zealand census, an increase of 9 people (5.2%) since the 2013 census, and an increase of 6 people (3.4%) since the 2006 census. There were 69 households. There were 99 males and 87 females, giving a sex ratio of 1.14 males per female, with 33 people (18.0%) aged under 15 years, 21 (11.5%) aged 15 to 29, 108 (59.0%) aged 30 to 64, and 21 (11.5%) aged 65 or older.

Ethnicities were 86.9% European/Pākehā, 8.2% Māori, 0.0% Pacific peoples, 6.6% Asian, and 6.6% other ethnicities (totals add to more than 100% since people could identify with multiple ethnicities).

Although some people objected to giving their religion, 54.1% had no religion, 27.9% were Christian, 1.6% were Muslim and 3.3% had other religions.

Of those at least 15 years old, 63 (42.0%) people had a bachelor or higher degree, and 18 (12.0%) people had no formal qualifications. The employment status of those at least 15 was that 93 (62.0%) people were employed full-time, 24 (16.0%) were part-time, and 3 (2.0%) were unemployed.

References

External links
 Map of Horokiwi
 Horokiwi Community website
 Horokiwi Quarry

Suburbs of Wellington City